Istanbul Bilgi University, officially established in 1996, is a private university located in Istanbul, Turkey.

The university has 4 campuses centrally-located in Istanbul namely SantralIstanbul, Kuştepe, Dolapdere and Kozyatağı.

As of 2020, Istanbul Bilgi University has near 20,000 students and 45,000 graduates; approximately 1,500 academicians; 7 faculties, 3 institutes, 4 schools, 3 vocational schools, and more than 150 programs that provide education to its associate, undergraduate and graduate students.

History

Adopting the principle of 'Non scholae, sed vitae discimus' (learning not for school but for life), İstanbul Bilgi University was founded as Turkey's fourth foundation university in 1996. The university took its place within the Turkish higher education system as a civil corporation after the application made by the Bilgi Education and Culture Foundation on 7 June 1996 and the subsequent approval by the Turkish Grand National Assembly.

Before its official foundation, a precursor to the university, İstanbul School of International Studies, started education in 1994 in partnership with Portsmouth University and the London School of Economics, offering courses in Business Administration, International Relations, Economics, and LSE Economics programs.

In 1997, Kuştepe Campus opened with 3 faculties, 2 institutes, and 12 programs with more than 1.000 students. The education in Dolapdere Campus started in 2000 and in the same year, the university officially graduated its first students.

Between 2006 and 2019, İstanbul Bilgi University got into a long-term partnership with Laureate Education and joined Laureate International Universities network, one of the largest international networks of universities in the world with more than 1,000,000 students enrolled at nearly 70 institutions in 5 continents.

In 2007, santralistanbul Campus, the third campus of the university, opened at the site of the historic Silahtarağa Power Plant, the first urban-scale power plant of the Ottoman Empire after a renovation process.

In 2015, Kozyatağı Campus was established at the Asian side of İstanbul.

In 2019, Can Holding joined Bilgi Education and Culture Foundation as a supporter.

Education
İstanbul Bilgi University has 7 faculties, 3 institutes, 4 schools, 3 vocational schools, and more than 150 programs that provide education to its associate, undergraduate and graduate students.

Faculty of Architecture 
 Architecture
 Industrial Design
 Interior Design

Faculty of Business 
 Business-Economics
 Economics
 Economics and Finance (Honors)
 Economics and Management (Honors)
 Business Administration
 Business Informatics
 International Finance
 International Trade and Business
 Management and Digital Innovation (Honors)
 Marketing

Faculty of Communication 
 Arts and Cultural Management
 Management of Performing Arts
 Advertising
 Communication and Design Management
 Public Relations
 Visual Communication Design
 Digital Game Design
 Film and Television
 Media and Communication
 Television Reporting and Programming

Faculty of Engineering and Natural Sciences 
 Civil Engineering
 Computer Engineering
 Electrical and Electronics Engineering
 Energy Systems Engineering
 Genetics and Bioengineering
 Industrial Engineering
 Mathematics
 Mechanical Engineering
 Mechatronics Engineering

Faculty of Health Sciences 
 Child Development
 Nursing
 Nutrition and Dietetics
 Physiotherapy and Rehabilitation

Faculty of Law 
 Law

Faculty of Social Sciences and Humanities 
 Comparative Literature
 English Language and Literature
 History
 International Relations
 European Union Studies
 Political Science
 Music
 Psychology
 Sociology

School of Applied Sciences 
 Fashion Design
 International Logistics and Transportation

School of Aviation 
 Aviation Management

School of Sports Sciences and Technology 
 Sports Management

School of Tourism and Hospitality 
 Gastronomy and Culinary Arts
 Tourism and Hotel Management

School of Advanced Vocational Studies 
 Accounting and Taxation
 Accounting and Taxation (Evening Education)
 Architectural Restoration
 Architectural Restoration (Evening Education)
 Computer Programming
 Cyber Security
 Construction Technology
 Construction Technology (Evening Education)
 Fashion Design
 Fashion Design (Evening Education)
 Graphic Design
 Graphic Design (Evening Education)
 Interior Space Design
 Banking and Insurance
 Banking and Insurance (Evening Education)
 International Trade
 Cooking
 Cooking (Evening Education)
 Public Relations and Advertising
 Civil Air Transportation Management
 Civil Air Transportation Management (Evening Education)
 Civil Aviation Cabin Services
 Civil Aviation Cabin Services (Evening Education)

Vocational School of Health Services 
 Child Development
 Child Development (Evening Education)
 Dental Prosthetics Technology
 Dental Prosthetics Technology (Evening Education)
 Oral and Dental Health
 Oral and Dental Health (Evening Education)
 Anesthesia
 Anesthesia (Evening Education)
 Audiometry
 Audiometry (Evening Education)
 Dialysis
 Dialysis (Evening Education)
 Electroneurophysiology
 First and Emergency Aid
 First and Emergency Aid (Evening Education)
 Medical Imaging Techniques
 Medical Imaging Techniques (Evening Education)
 Operating Room Services
 Operating Room Services (Evening Education)
 Opticianry
 Opticianry (Evening Education)
 Pathology Laboratory Techniques
 Emergency and Disaster Management
 Occupational Health and Safety
 Physiotherapy
 Physiotherapy (Evening Education)

Vocational School of Justice
 Justice

Graduate programs

Master Programs 
 Accounting and Auditing
 Architectural Design
 Banking and Finance
 Clinical Psychology
 Cultural Management
 Cultural Studies
 Economics
 Electrical-Electronics Engineering
 Entrepreneurship and Innovation in Technology / LITE: Learn, Innovation Technology and Entrepreneurship
 European Studies
 Film and Television
 Financial Economics
 History
 History, Theory and Criticism in Architecture
 Human Resource Management
 Information and Technology Law
 International Finance
 International Political Economy
 International Relations
 Law (Business Law/Human Rights Law)
 Marketing
 Marketing / Next Academy
 Marketing Communication
 MBA
 Media and Communication Systems
 Nutrition and Dietetics
 Organizational Psychology
 Philosophy and Social Thought
 Public Relations and Corporate Communication
 Social Projects and NGO Management
 Trauma and Disaster Mental Health
 Turkish-German Business Law (İstanbul Bilgi University-Cologne University

Online Master Programs 
 Banking and Finance Online
 e-MBA Turkish
 e-MBA English
 Human Resources Management Online
 Management Information Systems Online

Doctoral programs 
 Business Administration
 Communication
 Economics
 Political Science
 Private Law
 Public Law

Campuses

santralistanbul

santralistanbul Campus is the largest of the four University campuses, spreading over an area of 118,000 m2 (30 acres approx.). santralistanbul Campus, opened in 2007, is an arts and cultural complex located at the upper end of the Golden Horn in the Eyüp district of İstanbul, Turkey. The campus, consisting of the Energy Museum, an amphitheater, concert halls and a public library, is situated within the site of historic Silahtarağa Power Plant which was the first power plant of the Ottoman Empire.

The Main Gallery building in santralistanbul Campus, a space for contemporary art exhibitions and cultural events, was granted the International Architecture Awards in 2010.

The Energy Museum, Turkey's first industrial archeology museum, received “DASA Award” in 2012 from the European Museum Academy.

The Boiler House Building, which was renovated by architect Nevzat Sayın and is currently being used by the Faculty of Architecture, was granted the International Architecture Award 2018 by the Chicago Athenaeum Museum of Architecture and Design.

Additionally, the santralistanbul Campus has an annex building offering more than 5,000 sq m space to around 3,000 students, that can be reached in four minutes from the main campus.

Dolapdere
Dolapdere Campus is located very near to Taksim, Istanbul. The campus received "Structure and Life Architecture Award” in 2002 and the “European Award for Steel Structure” in 2005. The campus hosts the Faculty of Health Sciences, School of Applied Sciences, a fitness center and a short-course swimming pool.

Kuştepe

Located in Şişli district in Istanbul, Kuştepe Campus is Istanbul Bilgi University's first campus offering 32,000 m2 space. The campus hosts Vocational School of Health Services, the programs of Vocational Schools, English Preparatory Program and an indoor sports facility.

Kozyatağı Campus

Kozyatağı Campus is located at the Asian side of Istanbul with a 4,300 m2 space.

Campus life

Student Council 
Students at Istanbul Bilgi University are represented by a Student Council elected by the students each year during the fall semester. The council has the right to interfere in various issues regarding the school. Academic representatives from each department, elected by the students in the fall semester, are also a part of the council.

Student Clubs 
At Istanbul Bilgi University, there are more than 100 student clubs bringing students together through same hobbies and interests. Student clubs play a crucial role in the university's social life. As Bilgi University is considered as a relative liberal university, it was also Türkiye's first university to recognize an official student LGBT organization, named Gokkusagi, glossed as 'rainbow', in 2007.

Libraries and museums 

Istanbul Bilgi University has three libraries, one in Dolapdere Campus, one in Kuştepe Campus, and one in santralistanbul Campus. İstanbul Bilgi University's Library offers an extensive system to support university degree programs, research and teaching. The library contains more than 180.000 printed books, 500.000 electronic books, 60.000 electronic journals, 129 databases and e-encyclopedias. Access to these resources is available over internet, on-campus and off-campus.

santralistanbul Campus has the Energy Museum, Turkey's first industrial archaeology museum which came about with the conversion of the power plant's original turbine rooms and meticulous preservation of its contents.

İstanbul Bilgi University Press was founded in 2000.

Memberships and International Affiliations 

Istanbul Bilgi University has become one of the leading international universities in Turkey with nearly 2,000 international students from over 90 countries. The university has partner agreements with more than 250 leading institutions in 40 countries within the scope of Erasmus +, Bilateral and Swiss Mobility programs.

Istanbul Bilgi University is a member of the European University Association (EUA), The Magna Charta Observatory of Fundamental University Values and Rights, United Nations Global Compact (UNGC), Principles for Responsible Management Education (PRME), OECD Higher Education Programme IMHE, and the Association to Advance Collegiate Schools of Business (AACSB).

Rankings and awards

Istanbul Bilgi University has ranked among the top 130 universities in the “Top Universities in Emerging Europe and Central Asia” 2020 list of the reputable higher education quality surveyor QS. According to the rankings, BİLGİ is among the top 4 foundation universities in Turkey.

Additionally, Istanbul Bilgi University was awarded 4 stars by QS Stars in 2019. With this achievement, Bilgi has internationally proven its success in the fields of program design, research, international reputation, graduate employability, social responsibility, inclusiveness and facilities.

The 2019 results of “Turkey's University Satisfaction Survey (TÜMA)”, held by the University Assessment & Research Laboratory (ÜniAr), reveal that Istanbul Bilgi University ranks in the A group, which is known as the high satisfaction level.

Istanbul Bilgi University ranked among the top 400 universities in the field of political sciences according to Global Ranking of Academic Subjects 2019 report conducted by ShanghaiRanking Consultancy.

According to The Scientific and Technological Research Council of Turkey's (TÜBİTAK) “Entrepreneurial and Innovative Universities Index 2017”, Istanbul Bilgi University ranked among the top 40 universities.

Istanbul Bilgi University ranked third on Bloomberg Businessweek's “Best Universities of Turkey 2018” survey.

Additionally, Istanbul Bilgi University's English Preparatory Program has been awarded five-year accreditation from CEA (Commission on English Language Program Accreditation) in 2015.

The Psychology Undergraduate Program at Istanbul Bilgi University was accredited by the Association of Turkish Psychologists (TPD), as one of the 12 accredited programs among 77 psychology undergraduate programs in Turkey and TRNC.

The Couples and Family Therapy specialization within the Istanbul Bilgi University Clinical Psychology Graduate Program became, in 2015, the first and only program in Turkey to be accredited by the International Systemic Therapy Training Accreditation Committee of the International Family Therapy Association (IFTA).

Five undergraduate programs of Istanbul Bilgi University Faculty of Engineering and Natural Sciences (Computer, Electrical and Electronics, Energy Systems, Industrial, Genetics and Bioengineering) have been accredited by MÜDEK until 30 September 2020. MÜDEK (Association for Evaluation and Accreditation of Engineering Programs) is an institution fully authorized to provide accreditation by the Council of Higher Education.

In addition, Bilgi University became the first higher education institution in Turkey to be accredited by the WASC Senior College and University Commission (WSCUC), one of the most respected accreditation institutions in the world.

People

Board of Trustees 
Since its foundation, Istanbul Bilgi University has been administered by the Board of Trustees, which has 11 members.   Dr. Çağrı Bağcıoğlu  is President.

Notable past and present faculty

 Asaf Savas Akat
 Ulus Baker
 Murat Belge
 İsmail Cem (1940-2007)
 Ricky Ford
 Pınar Kür
 Şule Kut
 Butch Morris
 Niyazi Öktem
 İlter Turan
 İlhan Usmanbaş
 Serap Yazıcı
 Derviş Zaim
 Rona Serozan

Notable alumni 

 Ebru Günay
 Hazal Kaya
 Meriç Aral
 Enis Arıkan
 Kenan Doğulu
 Murat Boz
 Sıla
 Simay Barlas
Uraz Kaygılaroğlu

See also
 List of universities in Turkey

References

External links
 

 
Educational institutions established in 1996
Beyoğlu
Eyüp
Şişli
1996 establishments in Turkey